Huaji may refer to:
Yuwen Huaji, a Sui Dynasty emperor and general
Huaji, an emoji used in Baidu Tieba